Tomi Rautio (born March 18, 1996) is a Finnish professional ice hockey goaltender. He is currently a free agent having last played for Hokki of Mestis.

Rautio played one game for KooKoo during the 2015–16 Liiga season. He also had loan spells in Mestis with Hermes and Hokki before signing for Pyry of the Suomi-sarja on June 19, 2017. On May 16, 2018, Rautio returned to Hokki.

References

External links

1996 births
Living people
Finnish ice hockey goaltenders
Hokki players
Kokkolan Hermes players
KooKoo players
People from Kouvola
Sportspeople from Kymenlaakso